New Boston is the name of several places in the United States of America:

New Boston, Illinois
New Boston, Harrison County, Indiana
New Boston, Spencer County, Indiana
New Boston, Iowa
New Boston, Michigan
New Boston, Missouri
New Boston, New Hampshire, a New England town
New Boston (CDP), New Hampshire, the main village in the town
New Boston Space Force Station
New Boston, Ohio
New Boston, Pennsylvania
New Boston, Texas

See also
 Neu Boston, a village in the town of Storkow, Brandenburg, Germany
Boston (disambiguation)